The Grand Opera House, also known as the St. James Opera House, is a historic theater building in St. James, Minnesota, United States, completed in 1892.  It was listed on the National Register of Historic Places in 2009 for its local significance in the theme of entertainment/recreation.  It was nominated for being the city's principal performance venue from 1892 to 1921, bringing fine performing arts like theater, music, and comedy to a modest agricultural center, as well hosting local events.  Like many of the hundreds of opera houses built across the Midwestern United States from 1880 to 1910, the St. James opera house contains its auditorium on the upper floor, with retail space on the ground floor as a source of rental income.

See also
 National Register of Historic Places listings in Watonwan County, Minnesota

References

Buildings and structures in Watonwan County, Minnesota
Former theatres in the United States
Queen Anne architecture in Minnesota
Theatres completed in 1892
National Register of Historic Places in Watonwan County, Minnesota
Opera houses on the National Register of Historic Places in Minnesota
Opera houses in Minnesota